The 2012 Eisenhower Trophy took place 4–7 October on the PGA Sultan course at Antalya Golf Club and the Faldo course at Cornelia Golf Club in Antalya, Turkey. It was the 28th World Amateur Team Championship for the Eisenhower Trophy. The tournament was a 72-hole stroke play team event with 72 three-man teams. The best two scores for each round counted towards the team total. Each team was due to play two rounds on the two courses.

A weather delay on the second morning meant that the second round was not completed until the third day and the event was reduced to 54 holes. The leading 36 teams played their third round at Antalya Golf Club with the remaining teams playing at Cornelia Golf Club.

United States won their 14th Eisenhower Trophy, four strokes ahead of Mexico, who took the silver medal. France, Germany and South Korea tied for third place and took bronze medals. Sebastián Vázquez from Mexico had the best 54-hole aggregate of 199, 15 under par. Positions were decided by scores relative to par.

Teams
72 teams contested the event. Each team had three players with the exception of Croatia who were represented by only two players.

The following table lists the players on the leading teams.

Results

Source:

The leading 36 teams played their third round at Antalya Golf Club with the remaining teams playing at Cornelia Golf Club.

Individual leaders
There was no official recognition for the lowest individual scores.

Source:

Players in the leading teams played two rounds at Antalya Golf Club and one at Cornelia Golf Club.

References

External links
Coverage on International Golf Federation website

Eisenhower Trophy
Golf tournaments in Turkey
Eisenhower Trophy
Eisenhower Trophy
Eisenhower Trophy